The Evangelical Lutheran Church in Mozambique is an Evangelical Lutheran church in Mozambique. It has a membership of 12,606, and has been a member of the Lutheran World Federation since 1999. It is also affiliated with its regional expression, the Lutheran Communion in Southern Africa, and with the Christian Council of Mozambique. The church's head is Bishop Eduardo Sinalo

References

Lutheranism in Africa
Churches in Mozambique
Lutheran World Federation members